The National Heart Foundation of Australia (known as the Heart Foundation) is a charity established in 1959. Its activities have been funding cardiovascular research, supporting health professionals in their practice, developing health promotion activities, informing and educating the public and assisting people with cardiovascular disease. It describes its mission as "to reduce heart disease and improve the heart health and quality of life of all Australians through our work in Risk Reduction, Support, Care and Research."

History
The organisation emerged after tuberculosis had been effectively removed as a health concern and after the successful establishment of the Heart and Stroke Foundation of Canada. A group of concerned Sydney professionals meet with the trustees of R.T Hall Trust and members of the New South Wales government health services in July 1958 and decided to form the National Heart Foundation of Australia.

Programs

Supporting and informing
The foundation provides people with, and at risk of, cardiovascular disease information and guidance on how to minimise their risk. Annually, the organisation distributes more than 1.3 million heart health brochures. Each year, the Heart Foundation's information service and its website provides heart health information to thousands of Australians.

Partnerships
The foundation supports and works with all levels of government, other health organisations, the media and community groups and food manufacturers to implement policies and programmes that attempt to improve the cardiovascular health of Australians. This includes programmes on cardiovascular health risks such as smoking or physical inactivity, through to recovery and rehabilitation and diet. The foundation has partnered with the Health Star Rating System by assisting in monitoring the uptake and compliance of the Health Star Rating on applicable products. The foundation's collected data has been used in the formal reviews of the Health Star Rating and provided help in making the system more effective and accurate.

Improving care
The foundation claims to take the latest research and creates practical treatment tools for health practitioners. The foundation attempts to bridge gaps in care through programs specifically targeting those Australians at higher risk of cardiovascular disease.

Building healthy communities
The foundation supports local governments that change neighbourhoods to create healthier communities. Initiatives by councils, such as building cycleways and upgrading walking paths are eligible for Heart Foundation Local Government Awards (to be renamed Heart Foundation Healthy Community Awards in 2011).

Promoting awareness
Through community education campaigns and media activities, the foundation promotes lifestyle changes to improve the heart health of Australians. Recent examples include the Warning Signs campaign, which raises awareness of the symptoms of a heart attack and of the need to phone 000 so that sufferers can get early treatment to have the best chance for survival.

See also

 Healthcare in Australia
 Health Star Rating System

References

External links
 
 The National Heart Foundation of New Zealand

Health charities in Australia
Organizations established in 1959
1959 establishments in Australia
Heart disease organizations